Slatecut is an unincorporated community in Clark County, Indiana, in the United States. It was also written historically as Slate Cut.

History
A post office was established at Slatecut in 1858, and remained in operation until it was discontinued in 1891.

References

Unincorporated communities in Clark County, Indiana
Unincorporated communities in Indiana